In cricket, a dismissal occurs when a batter's innings is brought to an end by the opposing team. Other terms used are the batsman being out, the batting side losing a wicket, and the fielding side taking a wicket. The ball becomes dead (so no further runs can be scored off that delivery), and the dismissed batter must leave the field of play for the rest of their team's innings, to be replaced by a team-mate. A team's innings ends if ten of the eleven team members are dismissed. Players bat in pairs so, when only one batter is not out, it is not possible for the team to bat any longer. This is known as dismissing or bowling out the batting team, who are said to be all out.

The most common methods of dismissing a batter are (in descending order of frequency): caught, bowled, leg before wicket, run out, and stumped. Of these, the leg before wicket and stumped methods of dismissal can be seen as related to, or being special cases of, the bowled and run out methods of dismissal respectively.

Most methods of dismissal do not apply on an illegal delivery (i.e. a wide or no-ball) or the free hit delivery that follows a no-ball in certain competitions. Among the common methods of dismissal, only the "run out" dismissal can occur during any type of delivery.

Purpose
Once dismissed, a batsman cannot score any more runs in that innings. Thus dismissing batsmen is a way for the fielding side to control the runs scored in an innings, and prevent the batting side from either achieving their target score or posting a large total for the fielding side to follow in the next innings. Additionally, in Test and first-class cricket, it is usually necessary for the side fielding last to dismiss ten players of the opposing team in their final innings to achieve victory (unless one or more of the batsmen have retired hurt or absent and are unable to take the field).

Adjudication
By convention, dismissal decisions are handled primarily by the players – thus if the dismissal is obvious the batsman will voluntarily leave the field without the umpire needing to dismiss them. If the batsman and fielding side disagree about a dismissal then the fielding side must appeal to the umpire who will then decide whether the batsman is out. In competitive cricket, many difficult catching and LBW decisions will be left to the umpire; if a batsman acknowledges that they are out in such cases and departs without waiting for the umpire's decision it is known as "walking", and regarded as an honourable but controversial act.

If the umpire believes they have incorrectly dismissed a batsman, they may recall them to the crease if they have not already left the field of play. An example of this was in the 2007 Lord's test match between England and India when Kevin Pietersen was initially given out caught behind, but was recalled when television replays showed that the ball had bounced before being taken by Mahendra Singh Dhoni.

Methods of dismissal
A batsman can be dismissed in a number of ways, the most common being bowled, caught, leg before wicket (LBW), run out and stumped. An analysis of Test match dismissals between 1877 and 2012 found that 98.2% of the 63,584 Test match dismissals in this period were one of these five types. Much rarer were retired, hit the ball twice, hit wicket, handled the ball/obstructing the field, and timed out.

As it is possible to dismiss the non-striker, and possible to dismiss the striker from a wide (which does not count as a delivery for the batsman), this means a batsman can be dismissed without facing a single delivery. This is sometimes known as a diamond duck

Len Hutton, Desmond Haynes, and Steve Waugh were each dismissed in seven different ways over the course of their test career.

Common methods of dismissal

Law 32: Bowled

If a bowler's legitimate (i.e. not a No-ball) delivery hits the wicket and puts it down, the striker (the batsman facing the bowler) is out. The ball can either have struck the stumps directly, or have been deflected off the bat or body of the batsman. However, the batsman is not Bowled if the ball is touched by any other player or umpire before hitting the stumps.

Bowled takes precedence over all other methods of dismissal. What this means is, if a batsman could be given out both Bowled and also for another reason, then the other reason is disregarded, and the batsman is out Bowled.

Between 1877 and 2012, this method accounted for 21.4% of all Test match dismissals.

Law 33: Caught

If the batsman hits the ball, from a legitimate delivery (i.e. not a No-Ball), with the bat (or with the glove when the glove is in contact with the bat) and the ball is caught by the bowler or a fielder before it hits the ground, then the striker is out.

"Caught behind" (an unofficial term) indicates that a player was caught by the wicket-keeper, or less commonly by the slips. "Caught and bowled" indicates the player who bowled the ball also took the catch.

Caught takes precedence over all other methods of dismissal except Bowled. What this means is, if a batsman could be given out both Caught and also for another reason (except Bowled), then the other reason is disregarded, and the batsman is out Caught.

Between 1877 and 2012, this method accounted for 56.9% of all Test match dismissals, with 40.6% caught by fielders, and 16.3% caught by the wicket-keeper.

Law 36: Leg before wicket (lbw)

If a bowler's legitimate (i.e., not a No-ball) delivery strikes any part of the batsman (not necessarily the leg), without first touching the bat (or glove holding the bat), and, in the umpire's judgement, the ball would have hit the wicket but for this interception, then the striker is out. There are also further criteria that must be met, including where the ball pitched, whether the ball hit the batsman in line with the wickets, and whether the batsman was attempting to hit the ball, and these have changed over time.

Between 1877 and 2012, this method accounted for 14.3% of all Test match dismissals.

Law 38: Run out

A batsman is Run out if at any time while the ball is in play, the wicket in the ground closest to him is fairly put down by the opposing side while no part of the batsman's bat or body is grounded behind the popping crease.

This usually happens while the batsmen are running between the wickets, attempting to score a run. Either the striker or non-striker can be Run out. The batsman nearest the safe territory of the wicket that has been put down, but not actually in safe territory, is out. On the line is considered as out; frequently it is a close call whether or not a batsman gained his ground before the bails were removed, with the decision referred to the Decision Review System.

The difference between stumped and run out is that the wicket-keeper may stump a batsman who goes too far forward to play the ball (assuming he is not attempting a run), whilst any fielder, including the keeper, may run out a batsman who goes too far for any other purpose, including for taking a run.

A special form of run out is when the batsman at the non-striker's end attempts to gain an advantage by leaving the crease before the next ball has been bowled (a common practice known as "backing up", but against the laws of cricket). The bowler may then dislodge the bails at his/her end without completing the run-up and dismiss the batsman. This form of run-out is sometimes called the Mankad (the dismissed batsman is said to have been "Mankaded"), in reference to Vinoo Mankad, the first bowler to dismiss a batsman in this manner in a Test match, running out Bill Brown in 1947. With changes in the Laws of Cricket, a bowler cannot Mankad a batsman once they reach the point in their delivery where they would normally release the ball. It is considered good etiquette to warn a batsman that he is leaving his crease early, before attempting a Mankad run out on a subsequent ball. As per new ICC rule change, Mankad is no longer under Unfair play section, but under the normal Run-out section.

A run out cannot occur if no fielder has touched the ball. As such, if a batsman plays a straight drive which breaks the non-striker's stumps whilst he is outside his crease, he is not out. However, if a fielder (usually the bowler, in this case) touches the ball at all before it breaks the stumps at the non-striker's end, then it is a run out, even if the fielder never has any control of the ball.

Between 1877 and 2012, this method accounted for 3.5% of all Test match dismissals.

Law 39: Stumped

If the striker steps in front of the crease to play the ball, leaving no part of his body or the bat on the ground behind the crease, and the wicket-keeper is able to put down the wicket with the ball, then the striker is out. A stumping is most likely to be effected off slow bowling, or (less frequently) medium-paced bowling when the wicket-keeper is standing directly behind the stumps. As wicket-keepers stand several yards back from the stumps to fast bowlers, stumpings are hardly ever effected off fast bowlers. The ball can bounce off a keeper (but not external non-usual wicketkeeping protective equipment, like a helmet) and break the stumps and still be considered a stumping.

Stumped takes precedence over Run out. What this means is, if a batsman could be given out both Stumped and Run out, then Run out is disregarded, and the batsman is out Stumped.

Between 1877 and 2012, this method accounted for 2.0% of all Test match dismissals.

Rare methods of dismissal

Law 25.4: Retired

If any batsman leaves the field of play without the Umpire's consent for any reason other than injury or incapacity, he may resume the innings only with the consent of the opposing captain. If he fails to resume his innings, he is out. For the purposes of calculating a batting average, retired out is considered a dismissal.

Only two players in Test history have ever been given out in this manner: Marvan Atapattu (for 201) and Mahela Jayawardene (for 150), both in the same innings playing for Sri Lanka against Bangladesh in September 2001. Apparently, this was done in order to give the other players batting practice, but was considered unsportsmanlike and drew criticism. In May 1983, Gordon Greenidge of the West Indies retired out on 154 to visit his daughter, who was ill and who died two days later; he was subsequently judged to have retired not out, the only such decision in Test history.

There are numerous other recorded instances of batsmen retiring out in first-class cricket, particularly in tour matches and warm-up matches; since these matches are generally treated as practice matches, retiring out in these matches is not considered unsportsmanlike. In 1993 Graham Gooch, immediately after completing his hundredth first-class century with a six, retired on 105.

A player who retires hurt and does not return to bat by the end of the innings is not considered out for statistical purposes, though, as substitutes are not permitted to bat, the impact on play is effectively the same as if they had retired out.

Law 34: Hit the ball twice

If the batsman "hits" the ball twice, he is out. The first hit is the ball striking the batsman or his bat whilst the second hit is the batsman intentionally making separate contact with the ball, not necessarily with the bat (it is therefore possible to be out hitting the ball twice whilst not actually hitting the ball with the bat either time). The batsman is allowed to hit the ball a second time with his bat or body (but not a hand that is not in contact with the bat) if this is performed in order to stop the ball from hitting the stumps.

No batsman has been out hitting the ball twice in Test cricket.

Law 35: Hit wicket

If the batsman dislodges his own stumps with his body or bat, while in the process of taking a shot or beginning his first run, then he is out. This law does not apply if he avoided a ball thrown back to the wicket by a fielder, or broke the wicket in avoiding a run out.

This law also applies if part of the batsman's equipment is dislodged and hits the stumps: Dwayne Bravo hit Kevin Pietersen in the head with a bouncer and his helmet hit the stumps during the 2007 England vs West Indies Test match at Old Trafford; a topspinner from Richie Benaud once knocked off Joe Solomon's cap, and the cap landed on Solomon's stumps.

Being out hit-wicket is often seen as a comic method of dismissal. In 1991 Jonathan Agnew and Brian Johnston, commentators on BBC Radio's Test Match Special, got themselves into difficulty while commentating on Ian Botham's dismissal (Botham dislodged his leg bail whilst trying to step over the stumps, having lost his balance in missing a hook shot against Curtly Ambrose), Agnew commenting that he "couldn't quite get his leg over".

A more recent example of a comic hit-wicket dismissal was during the Headingley Test match in the 2006 test series between England and Pakistan, when Pakistan captain Inzamam-ul-Haq missed a sweep against Monty Panesar, was hit in the midriff by the ball, lost his balance and collapsed on to his stumps (and nearly into wicket-keeper Chris Read).

Law 37: Obstructing the field

If the batsman, by action or by words, obstructs or distracts the fielding side, then he is out. This law now encompasses transgressions that would previously have been covered by handled the ball, which has now been removed from the Laws.

Only one player has ever been out obstructing the field in a Test match: England's Len Hutton, playing against South Africa at The Oval in London in 1951, knocked a ball away from his stumps, but in doing so prevented the South African wicket-keeper Russell Endean from completing a catch. By coincidence, Endean was one of the few people to be given out handled the ball in a Test match. In One Day International cricket, eight batsmen have been given out obstructing the field.

Law 40: Timed out

An incoming batsman is "timed out" if he willfully takes more than three minutes to be ready to face the next delivery (or be at the other end if not on strike). If a not out batsman is not ready after a break in play, they can also be given out timed out on appeal. In the case of extremely long delays, the umpires may forfeit the match to either team. So far, this method of taking a wicket has never happened in the history of Test cricket and there have been only five occasions in all forms of first-class cricket.

Obsolete dismissal types

Handled the ball

Before the amendments of the Laws in 2017, there was a separate dismissal type of Handled the ball which is now covered by Obstructing the field.
If the batsman touched the ball with a hand not in contact with the bat for any purpose other than to prevent themselves being injured or, with the approval of the fielding team, to return the ball to a fielder, he was out on appeal. It was considered good etiquette for the fielding team not to appeal if the handling of the ball did not affect the play of the game, although there have been occasions when this etiquette was ignored.

Only seven batsmen have been out handled the ball in the history of Test cricket, and two in One Day Internationals.

See also
 List of cricket terms
 List of unusual dismissals in international cricket

References

External links
 The Laws of Cricket
 Ten ways of getting out – BBC
 11 different ways in which a batsman can be dismissed – The Guardian
 Rules and regulations of cricket video – WisdomTalkies

Cricket
Cricket laws and regulations
Cricket terminology